Itacurubí del Rosario is a town in the San Pedro department of Paraguay.

Sources 
World Gazeteer: Paraguay – World-Gazetteer.com

Populated places in the San Pedro Department, Paraguay